The 435th Bombardment Squadron, also known as the "Kangaroo" Squadron, is an inactive United States Air Force unit.  It was last assigned to the Eighth Air Force 333d Bombardment Group, based at Kadena Air Base, Okinawa. It was inactivated on 28 May 1946.

History

Combat in the Southwest Pacific

Formed in Australia in early 1942 by a combination of Fifth Air Force personnel and Boeing B-17 Flying Fortress aircraft that escaped from the Philippines and replacement aircraft that reached Australia from Hawaii and via the South Atlantic air ferry route from Florida,  and arriving in Western Australia. As the 40th Reconnaissance Squadron, the squadron evacuated General Douglas MacArthur and President Manuel Quezon from Del Monte Field in the Philippine Islands in March 1942. 
	
Redesignated as 435th Bombardment Squadron and engaged in strategic bombardment and reconnaissance of enemy targets in New Guinea; Coral Sea and Solomon Islands from Northern Queensland. The 435th Squadron operated primarily as a reconnaissance squadron in the Southwest Pacific area. Two thirds of more than 540 combat missions in the Australian Theater were reconnaissance missions. All of the 168 missions out of Hawaii and the Fiji Islands were patrols.  Although a portion of the 19th Bombardment Group in Australia, technically speaking, this squadron operated independently of the group and under the direct supervision of the 5th Bomber Command. Photographs and information went directly to 5th Bomber Command. Withdrawn from combat in November 1942 when the B-17C/E models in Australia were replaced by long-range Consolidated B-24 Liberators.

Training unit

The unit was returned to the United States and became an operational training unit with II Bomber Command for replacement B-17 personnel.

Return to the Pacific
The squadron was again activated at Dalhart Army Air Field, Texas on 7 July 1944, but this time was assigned to the 333d Bombardment Group.  The 333d Group was a former heavy bomber training unit that had been inactivated in the spring of 1944 in a general Army Air Forces reorganization of its training and support units. It was reactivated in July as a Boeing B-29 Superfortress group.  The squadron trained with Superfortresses until June 1945, when it departed for the Pacific to become an element of Eighth Air Force, which was organizing on Okinawa as a second very heavy bomber air force in the Pacific.  However, the squadron did not arrive at its combat station, Kadena Airfield, until it was too late to participate in combat.  The squadron flew show-of-force missions and its aircraft helped evacuate prisoners of war from Japan to airfields in the Philippines. The unit was inactivated on 28 May 1946.

Lineage
 40th Reconnaissance Squadron formed on 14 March 1942, by authority of War Department but apparently without formal constitution and activation.
 Redesignated 435th Bombardment Squadron (Heavy) on 22 April 1942
 Inactivated on 1 April 1944
 Redesignated 435th Bombardment Squadron, Very Heavy and activated on 1 April 1944
 Inactivated on 10 May 1944
 Activated on 7 July 1944
 Inactivated on 28 May 1946

Assignments
 19th Bombardment Group, 14 March 1942 – 1 April 1944 (attached to Allied Air Forces, c. 17 July–c. 24 September 1942)
 19th Bombardment Group, 1 April–10 May 1944
 333d Bombardment Group, 7 July 1944 – 28 May 1946

Stations
 RAAF Base Townsville, Australia, 14 March–c. 15 November 1942
 Pocatello Army Air Field, Idaho, C. 30 December 1943
 Pyote Army Air Base, Texas, 5 January 1943 – 1 April 1944
 Great Bend Army Air Field, Kansas, 1 April– 10 May 1944
 Dalhart Army Air Field, Texas, 7 July 1944
 Great Bend Army Air Field, Kansas, 10 December 1944 – 19 June 1945
 Kadena Airfield, Okinawa, 5 August 1945 – 28 May 1946

Aircraft
 Consolidated LB-30 Liberator, 1942
 Boeing B-17 Flying Fortress, 1942–1944
 Boeing B-29 Superfortress 1944–1946

See also
 United States Army Air Forces in Australia

Notes

References

Bibliography

 
 
 
 

Bombardment squadrons of the United States Air Force
Strategic bombing squadrons of the United States Army Air Forces
Military units and formations established in 1942